An incendiary balloon (or balloon bomb) is a balloon inflated with a lighter-than-air gas such as hot air, hydrogen, or helium, that has a bomb, incendiary device, or Molotov cocktail attached. The balloon is carried by the prevailing winds to the target area, where it falls or releases its payload.

Historical use

Early proposals 

In 1792, Joseph-Michel Montgolfier proposed using balloons to drop bombs on British forces and ships in Toulon.

In 1807, Denmark attempted to construct a hand-propelled dirigible that would bomb British ships blockading Copenhagen from the air.

In 1846 a British board rejected as impractical a bombing design by Samuel Alfred Warner. Attempts by Henry Tracey Coxwell to interest the British government a few years later were rejected as well.

In 1847, John Wise proposed the use of balloon bombs in the Mexican–American War.

Austrian use at Venice in 1849
The first aggressive use of balloons in warfare took place in 1849 during the First Italian War of Independence. Austrian imperial forces besieging Venice attempted to float some 200 paper hot air balloons, each carrying a  bomb that was to be dropped from the balloon with a time fuse over the besieged city. The balloons were launched mainly from land; however, some were also launched from the side-wheel steamer SMS Vulcano that acted as a balloon carrier. The Austrians used smaller pilot balloons to determine the correct fuse settings. At least one bomb fell in the city; however, due to the wind changing after launch, most of the balloons missed their target, and some drifted back over Austrian lines and the launching ship Vulcano.

World War II

Operation Outward 

During World War II, the British Operation Outward launched some 99,142 balloons at Germany, 53,543 of which were carrying incendiaries, the other 45,599 carrying trailing wires to damage high voltage lines.

Fu-Go 

In 1944–1945, during World War II, Japan launched some 9,300 Fu-Go balloon bombs at North America. The  diameter balloons were inflated with hydrogen and typically carried one  bomb, or one  bomb along with four  bombs. The Fu-Go utilized the  winter jet stream to cross  of the Pacific Ocean in approximately three days. To control altitude, the balloon used a barometric sensor that would release ballast sand-bags when the balloon went below . When the sensor registered an altitude of above , hydrogen was vented from the balloon. The whole mechanism was activated 52 minutes after launch to allow the balloon to reach initial altitude. The final sandbag stations were fitted with incendiary bombs which were released by the same mechanism, and after the last release the balloon activated a self-destruct mechanism and released an additional bomb.

The balloons were launched in the winter to take advantage of the more favorable winter jet stream. However this limited their damage potential as wildfires were less likely to catch in winter. The Fu-Go balloons inflicted relatively little damage, except for one fatal incident in which a woman and five children were killed near Bly, Oregon after they approached a balloon that had landed at the subsequently named Mitchell Recreation Area. The deaths of six civilians were the only fatalities caused by fire balloons on American soil during World War II.

Cold War

United States 
Following World War II, the United States developed the E77 balloon bomb based on the Fu-Go balloon. This balloon was intended to disperse an anti-crop agent; however, it was not used operationally. The 1954–1955 WS-124A Flying Cloud program tested high-altitude balloons for delivery of weapons of mass destruction, but was found unfeasible in terms of accuracy.

Current use

Gaza Strip 

Since the beginning of the 2018 Gaza border protests, Palestinians have been launching incendiary kites at Israel as a form of agro-terrorism. Since the beginning of May 2018, helium-filled incendiary balloons have been used alongside the kites. Gazan balloons are devised from helium-filled party balloons or condoms that are strung together, with flaming rags, other incendiary devices, or explosives strung below. The prevailing wind blowing in from the Mediterranean Sea, propels the balloons inland from Gaza into Israel.

According to a report in Ynet, as of 10 July 2018, incendiary kites and balloons started 678 fires in Israel, burning  of woodland,  of agricultural crops, as well as open fields. Some balloons landed in the Eshkol Regional Council and the Sdot Negev Regional Council, and no one was injured.

See also
 Sky lantern

References 

Balloons
Bombs
Improvised weapons
Incendiary weapons
Biological anti-agriculture weapons